Lonely Astronaut Records is a record label founded by musician Joseph Arthur, his long-time professional partner Lauren Pattenaude, and Eric Gerber. The label was created in 2006. Thus far, the label has only its founder Joseph Arthur on the roster, which also includes releases produced with his band The Lonely Astronauts.

Roster
Joseph Arthur

Catalog

 001: Nuclear Daydream (September 19, 2006)
 002: Let's Just Be (April 17, 2007)
 003: Could We Survive (EP) (March 18, 2008)
 004: Crazy Rain (EP) (April 15, 2008)
 005: Vagabond Skies (EP) (June 10, 2008)
 006: Foreign Girls (EP) (July 8, 2008)
 007: Temporary People (September 30, 2008)
 008: Temporary People (12" vinyl LP) (February 3, 2009)
 009: The Graduation Ceremony (May 24, 2011)

See also
List of record labels

External links
Official website
Official MySpace

Joseph Arthur
Record labels established in 2006
American independent record labels
Indie rock record labels
Alternative rock record labels